Plagiorchiida is a large order of trematodes, synonymous to Echinostomida. They belong to the Digenea, a large subclass of flukes. This order contains relatively few significant parasites of humans.

The following families are placed here, organised by superfamily and suborder:

 Apocreadiata
 Apocreadioidea Skrjabin, 1942
 Apocreadiidae Skrjabin, 1942
 Bivesiculata
 Bivesiculoidea
 Bivesiculidae Yamaguti, 1934
 Bucephalata
 Bucephaloidea Poche, 1907
 Bucephalidae Poche, 1907
 Nuitrematidae Kurochkin, 1975
 Echinostomata
 Echinostomatoidea Looss, 1902
 Caballerotrematidae Tkach, Kudlai & Kostadinova, 2016
 Calycodidae Dollfus, 1929
 Cyclocoelidae Stossich, 1902
 Echinochasmidae Odhner, 1910
 Echinostomatidae Looss, 1899
 Fasciolidae Railliet, 1895
 Himasthlidae Odhner, 1910
 Philophthalmidae Looss, 1899
 Psilostomidae Looss, 1900
 Rhytidodidae Odhner, 1926
 Typhlocoelidae Harrah, 1922
 Gymnophallata
 Gymnophalloidea Odhner, 1905
 Botulisaccidae Yamaguti, 1971
 Fellodistomidae Nicoll, 1909
 Gymnophallidae Odhner, 1905
 Tandanicolidae Johnston, 1927
 Haploporata
 Haploporoidea Nicoll, 1914
 Atractotrematidae Yamaguti, 1939
 Haploporidae Nicoll, 1914
 Haplosplanchnata
 Haplosplanchnoidea Poche, 1925
 Haplosplanchnidae Poche, 1926
 Hemiurata
 Azygioidea Lühe, 1909
 Azygiidae Lühe, 1909
 Hemiuroidea Looss, 1899
 Accacoeliidae Odhner, 1911
 Bathycotylidae Dollfus, 1932
 Derogenidae Nicoll, 1910
 Dictysarcidae Skrjabin & Guschanskaja, 1955
 Didymozoidae Monticelli, 1888
 Gonocercidae Skrjabin & Guschanskaja, 1955
 Hemiuridae Looss, 1899
 Hirudinellidae Dollfus, 1932
 Isoparorchiidae Travassos, 1922
 Lecithasteridae Odhner, 1905
 Ptychogonimidae Dollfus, 1937
 Sclerodistomidae Odhner, 1927
 Sclerodistomoididae Gibson & Bray, 1979
 Syncoeliidae Looss, 1899
 Heronimata
 Heronimoidea Ward, 1918
 Heronimidae Ward, 1918
 Lepocreadiata
 Lepocreadioidea Odhner, 1905
 Aephnidiogenidae Yamaguti, 1934
 Deropristidae Cable & Hunninen, 1942
 Enenteridae Yamaguti, 1958
 Gorgocephalidae Manter, 1966
 Gyliauchenidae Fukui, 1929
 Lepidapedidae Yamaguti, 1958
 Lepocreadiidae Odhner, 1905
 Lepocreadioidea incertae sedis
 Liliatrematidae Gubanov, 1953
 Monorchiata
 Monorchioidea Odhner, 1911
 Lissorchiidae Magath, 1917
 Monorchiidae Odhner, 1911
 Opisthorchiata
 Opisthorchioidea Braun, 1901
Cryptogonimidae Ward, 1917
Heterophyidae Leiper, 1909
Opisthorchiidae Looss, 1899
 Pronocephalata
 Paramphistomoidea Fischoeder, 1901
 Cladorchiidae Fischoeder, 1901
 Mesometridae Poche, 1926
 Microscaphidiidae Looss, 1900
 Paramphistomidae Fischoeder, 1901
 Pronocephaloidea Looss, 1899
 Labicolidae Blair, 1979
 Notocotylidae Lühe, 1909
 Nudacotylidae Barker, 1916
 Opisthotrematidae Poche, 1926
 Pronocephalidae Looss, 1899
 Rhabdiopoeidae Poche, 1926
 Transversotremata
 Transversotrematoidea Witenberg, 1944
 Transversotrematidae Witenberg, 1944
 Xiphidiata
 Brachycladioidea Odhner, 1905
 Acanthocolpidae Lühe, 1906
 Brachycladiidae Odhner, 1905
 Gorgoderoidea Looss, 1901
 Allocreadiidae Looss, 1902
 Anchitrematidae Mehra, 1935
 Braunotrematidae Yamaguti, 1958
 Callodistomidae Odhner, 1910
 Dicrocoeliidae Looss, 1899
 Gorgoderidae Looss, 1899
 Mesocoeliidae Faust, 1924
 Orchipedidae Skrjabin, 1913
 Microphalloidea Ward, 1901
 Diplangidae Yamaguti, 1971
 Exotidendriidae Mehra, 1935
 Faustulidae Poche, 1926
 Microphallidae Ward, 1901
 Pachypsolidae Yamaguti, 1958
 Phaneropsolidae Mehra, 1935
 Pleurogenidae Looss, 1899
 Prosthogonimidae Lühe, 1909
 Renicolidae Dollfus, 1939
 Zoogonidae Odhner, 1902
 Opecoelioidea Ozaki, 1925
 Batrachotrematidae Dollfus & Williams, 1966
 Opecoelidae Ozaki, 1925
 Zdzitowieckitrema Sokolov, Lebedeva, Gordeev & Khasanov, 2019
 Plagiorchioidea Lühe, 1901
 Auridistomidae Lühe, 1901
 Brachycoeliidae Looss, 1899
 Cephalogonimidae Looss, 1899
 Choanocotylidae Jue Sue & Platt, 1998
 Echinoporidae Krasnolobova & Timofeeva, 1965
 Encyclometridae Mehra, 1931
 Leptophallidae Dayal, 1938
 Macroderoididae McMullen, 1937
 Meristocotylidae Fischthal & Kuntz, 1981
 Ocadiatrematidae Fischthal & Kuntz, 1981
 Orientocreadiidae Yamaguti, 1958
 Plagiorchiidae Lühe, 1901
 Styphlotrematidae Baer, 1924
 Telorchiidae Looss, 1899
 Thrinascotrematidae Jue Sue & Platt, 1999
 Urotrematidae Poche, 1926
 Troglotrematoidea Odhner, 1914
 Paragonimidae Dollfus, 1939
 Troglotrematidae  Odhner, 1914

References

 
Platyhelminthes orders